A general-purpose bomb is an air-dropped bomb intended as a compromise between blast damage, penetration, and fragmentation in explosive effect. They are designed to be effective against enemy troops, vehicles, and buildings.

Characteristics

General-purpose (GP) bombs use a thick-walled metal casing with explosive filler (typically TNT, Composition B, or Tritonal in NATO or United States service) comprising about 30% to 40% of the bomb's total weight.  The British term for a bomb of this type is "medium case" or "medium capacity" (MC). The GP bomb is a common weapon of fighter bomber and attack aircraft because it is useful for a variety of tactical applications and relatively cheap.

General-purpose bombs are often identified by their weight (e.g.). In many cases this is strictly a nominal weight (the counterpart to the caliber of a firearm), and the actual weight of each individual weapon may vary depending on its retardation, fusing, carriage, and guidance systems.

Most modern air-dropped GP bombs are designed to minimize drag for external carriage on aircraft lacking bomb bays.

In low-altitude attacks, there is a danger of the attacking aircraft being caught in the blast of its own weapons. To address this problem, GP bombs are often fitted with retarders, parachutes or pop-out fins that slow the bomb's descent to allow the aircraft time to escape the detonation.

GP bombs can be fitted with a variety of fuzes and fins for different uses. One notable example is the "daisy cutter" fuze used in Vietnam War era American weapons, an extended probe designed to ensure that the bomb would detonate on contact (even with foliage) rather than burying itself in earth or mud, which would reduce its effectiveness. (This was not the first instance of such devices. As early as World War II, the Luftwaffe was using extended-nose fuzes on bombs dropped by Stuka dive-bombers and other aircraft for exactly the same reason. A blast several feet above the ground is many times more effective and has a far greater radius than one that is delayed until the bomb is below the surface.)

GP bombs are commonly used as the warheads for more sophisticated precision-guided munitions. Using various types of seeker and electrically controlled fins turns a basic 'iron' bomb into a laser-guided bomb (like the U.S. Paveway series), an electro-optical guided bomb, or, more recently, GPS-guided weapon (like the U.S. JDAM). The combination is cheaper than a true guided missile (and can be more easily upgraded or replaced in service), but is substantially more accurate than an unguided bomb.

Historic GP bombs

WWII-era British general-purpose bombs
During WWII the British adopted a description of general-purpose bombs as medium capacity (MC) bombs. The  MC was developed from 1942 to replace the existing 1000 lb GP (General Purpose) bomb. Initially using most of the components of the 1000 lb GP it was decided to give it a new tail and it was built with a half-inch-thick wall. Fillings could be Amatex, Amatol, Minol, RDX and others.
It was introduced to service in 1943 and about a quarter of a million were produced by the end of the war.

  General-Purpose bomb – produced 1937 to 1941
  General-Purpose Bomb – not produced
  General-Purpose Bomb – abandoned project
  General-Purpose Bomb (1926 onwards) – replaced by 250 lb MC in 1942
  General-Purpose Bomb (1926 onwards) – replaced by 500 lb MC in 1942
  General-Purpose Bomb (1939 onwards) – replaced by 1000 lb MC in 1943
  General-Purpose Bomb (1941 onwards)
  General-Purpose Bomb (1943) – replaced by 4000 lb HC

Modern GP bombs

Modern American GP bombs: the Mark 80 series

During the Korean War and Vietnam War the U.S. used older designs like the M65, M117 and M118, which had an explosive content about 65% higher than most contemporary weapons. Although some of these weapons remain in the U.S. arsenal, they are little used and the M117 is primarily carried only by the B-52 Stratofortress.

The primary U.S. GP bombs are the Mark 80 series. This class of weapons uses a shape known as Aero 1A, designed by  Ed Heinemann of Douglas Aircraft as the result of studies in 1946. It has a length-to-diameter ratio of about 8:1, and results in minimal drag for the carrier aircraft. The Mark 80 series was not used in combat until the Vietnam War, but has since replaced most earlier GP weapons. It includes four basic weapon types:

 Mark 81 – nominal weight 
 Mark 82 – nominal weight 
 Mark 83 – nominal weight 
 Mark 84 – nominal weight 

Vietnam service showed the Mk 81 "Firecracker" to be insufficiently effective, and it was withdrawn from U.S. service. However, recently, precision-guided variants of the Mk 81 bomb have begun a return to service, based on U.S. experience in Iraq after 2003, and the desire to reduce collateral damage compared to Mk 82 and larger bombs (e.g., when attacking a single small building in a populated area).

Since the Vietnam War and the 1967 USS Forrestal fire, United States Navy and United States Marine Corps GP bombs are distinguished by a thick ablative fire-retardant coating, which is designed to delay any potential accidental explosion in the event of a shipboard fire. Fire is less a danger in a land-based facility, where the personnel can be evacuated with relative ease, and the building be the only loss. At sea, the crew and munitions share a facility (the ship), and thus are in much more danger of fire reaching munitions (which tend to be more closely packed, due to space limitations). Also, losing a munitions storage building on land is far cheaper than sacrificing an entire naval vessel, even if one could easily evacuate the crew.

All Mk 80 bombs have both nose and tail fuze wells and can accept a variety of fuzes. Various nose and tail kits can be fitted to adapt the weapon for a variety of roles.

In the Mk 80 series bomb bodies is also used in the following weapons:
 BDU-50 A practice (no explosive) version of the Mk 82 bomb body
 BDU-56 A practice (no explosive) version of the Mk 84 bomb body
On August 14, 2020, Kaman Precision Products received roughly $57.3 million for a "cockpit-selectable" bomb fuze to be used on Mark 80 warheads (guided and unguided). The contract involved foreign military sales (FMS) to 25 unnamed countries.

Smart bomb kits
Dumb Mk 80 bombs could be converted to smart bombs with attached kits:
 GBU-12D Paveway II (Mk 82) laser-guided
 GBU-16B Paveway II (Mk 83) laser-guided
 GBU-24B Paveway III (Mk 84) laser-guided
 GBU-38 JDAM (Mk 82) INS/GPS guided
 GBU-32 JDAM (Mk 83) INS/GPS guided
 GBU-31 JDAM (Mk 84) INS/GPS guided
 GBU-X - a new guided general-purpose bomb under development.

Retarded versions
 Mk 82 Snake Eye was a standard Mk 82 with folded, retarding petals.
 Mk 82 Retarded was a standard Mk 82 with a ballute.
 Mk 83 Retarded was a standard Mk 83 with a ballute.
 Mk 84 Retarded was a standard Mk 84 with a ballute.

Modern British GP bombs
The smaller 540 lb was retired with the demise of the Harrier GR9 aircraft with the larger 1000 lb being retired in Apr 2019. Currently the UK only uses the 500 lb class Paveway IV weapon system. The warhead is a modified enhanced Mk 82 warhead.

Soviet and Russian GP bombs

The Russian term for general-purpose bomb is fugasnaya aviatsionnaya bomba (FAB) and followed by the bomb's nominal weight in kilograms. Most Russian iron bombs have circular ring airfoils rather than the fins used by Western types.

The original, 1946-series bombs had poor ballistic characteristics at supersonic speed, and their construction was fragile. As an interim measure, upgraded versions of the bombs were built with thicker walls and no nose fuze. The thick-walled version of the bombs were built until 1956.

A feature of the 1954 series of bombs is the ballistic ring on the nose of the bomb which acts as a vortex generator to aid the bombs stabilizers. The smaller (less than ) bombs had a single nose and a single tail fuze, while the larger weapons shared a single nose fuze and two base fuzes. The FAB-9000 weapon was roughly comparable to the wartime Grand Slam bomb. It was used by Russian aircraft designers as a substitute for early nuclear weapons when determining the size and clearances of bomb bays.

In 1962 a new series of streamlined, low-drag bombs was introduced, designed for external carriage by fighter-bomber aircraft rather than in internal bays. Both bombs have a single nose fuze.

Both the 54 and 62 series designs remain in use. The most common of these are the FAB-100, FAB-250, FAB-500, FAB-750, and FAB-1500, roughly corresponding to the U.S. Mark 80 series. These have seen widespread service in Russia, Warsaw Pact nations, and various export countries.

Larger bombs with less streamlined shapes also remained in the Soviet arsenal, primarily for use by heavy bombers. In the Iran–Iraq War, FAB-5000 and FAB-9000 bombs were dropped by Iraqi Air Force Tupolev Tu-22 bombers, generally against large, fixed targets in Iran. In Afghanistan in the 1980s, Soviet Tupolev Tu-16 and Tupolev Tu-22M bombers used massive FAB-1500, FAB-3000, FAB-5000NG, and FAB-9000 bombs to devastating effect during the Panjshir offensives.

 FAB-100
 FAB-250M-54
 KhAB-250 , KhAB-500
 IAB-500 inert nw tnw training ; other liquid fuel phosphorus incendiary
 FAB-500 F = HE ; FAB-500M-54 ,  FAB-500M-62
 various nuclear ABs
 ZAB Z incendiary, P-50T wp smoke/incendiary ; ZB Bak
 FZAB ; OFZAB, OZAB
 ODAB OD = vacuum
 OFAB, OAB oskolochno fragmentation
 DAB fumogen, SAB flare or free fall HE
 BetAB concrete, BrAB armour ; PTAB AT
 RBK
 LAB laser, UAB & UPAB guided, IKAB TAB (thermal IR) TelAB (cam)
 KAB-250,  KAB-250S-E, KAB-250LG-E
 KAB-500L (K correction trajectory) guided, KAB-500Kr
 KAB-1500Kr , KAB-1500L
 ODAB-500PM
 AVBPM

French GP bombs
The most common are the  EU2 and T25,  T200, and  BL4.

 Société des Ateliers Mécaniques de Pont-sur-Sambre (SAMP)  General-Purpose bomb; (analogue to Mk 81)
 SAMP BL EU2 ( Retarded General-Purpose bomb)
 SAMP EU2 ( General-Purpose bomb; analogue to Mk 82)
 SAMP 25FE ( General-Purpose bomb; analogue to Mk 82)
 SAMP T200 ( General-Purpose bomb; analogue to Mk 83)
 SAMP BL4 ( General-Purpose bomb; analogue to Mk 84)

Other nations
Other countries, including Australia, Azerbaijan, Brazil, Chile, Greece, India, Israel, Pakistan, Poland, Portugal, Romania, South Africa, Spain, Sweden, and Turkey, manufacture their own bombs, most of which are either licensed versions of the U.S. Mark 80 series or close copies but India's DRDO has developed its own variants of bombs in the name of High Speed Low Drag Bomb

See also
 Unguided bomb
 Blockbuster bomb – chosen for blast effect

References
Citations

Bibliography

 
 

Aerial bombs